Bret Michael Harrison (born April 6, 1982) is an American actor and musician known predominantly for his work on comedy television series such as Grounded for Life, The Loop, Reaper, and Breaking In.

Early life
Harrison was born in Portland, Oregon. In his senior year, he attended Tualatin High School in Tualatin, Oregon. His first acting role came at the Hillsboro Artists' Regional Theatre in his home state where he had the role of George in Our Town.

Career

Acting
One of his first TV appearances was in the third season of MTV's Undressed and the MTV film Everybody's Doing It. In 2002, Harrison appeared as Lonny in the movie Orange County. His first major role was dorky next-door neighbor Brad O'Keefe on Grounded for Life. In 2004, Harrison starred as Green Graves in the coming of age drama film Lightning Bug.

Harrison appeared in four episodes of That '70s Show as Charlie Richardson, a character intended to be a replacement for departing cast member Topher Grace but Harrison decided to work on another series. He appeared in The O.C. as Danny, Seth's rival. He had a dramatic guest role on Law & Order: Special Victims Unit as Sam Cavanaugh, a young victim of sexual abuse. In film, he appeared alongside Jack Black and Colin Hanks in Orange County. In addition, Harrison also starred in the movie Deal, which was released in the US on April 26, 2008.
During 2006–2007 he starred in The Loop, as a young professional trying to balance the needs of his social life with the pressures of working at the corporate headquarters of a major U.S. airline. It was canceled following the second season in 2007. Later in 2007, he became the star of The CW series, Reaper as Sam Oliver. Reaper was canceled on May 19, 2009, after two seasons.

Bret Harrison played Dr. Sidney Miller on ABC's re-imagined V series. Harrison's character appears throughout Season 2 (2011) as an evolutionary biologist and eventual member of the counter-visitor resistance. Harrison starred as Jerry in a short film titled Cost of Living co-starring Brandon Routh.
He starred as Scottie Smith in the road trip comedy film Mardi Gras: Spring Break. Also in 2011, he was signed by Fox to fill a main cast role in a mid-season replacement comedy called Breaking In.

In 2015, Harrison signed on to play Gordon Cooper on ABC's The Astronaut Wives Club and played the role of Barry Burwood in movie See You in Valhalla. In 2016, Harrison had a recurring role as Kenny in the Netflix sitcom series The Ranch. In 2017, Harrison guest starred as Brad in an episode of Mom and in 2018, he guest starred as Sam Oliver in an episode of Kevin (Probably) Saves the World.

Music
Big Japan is a four-piece indie rock band from Los Angeles, with Nathanial Castro on vocals and guitar, Adam Brody on drums, Harrison on guitar and Brad Babinski on bass. The band only performs, writes and records sporadically given Brody and Harrison's unpredictable acting schedules. Their first band name was Steven's Team, named after the film The Cable Guy.

Big Japan's first release, Music for Dummies, was digitally released through Nightshift Records on August 23, 2005. This CD originally titled Music for Dummies was changed to Untitled thus the limited number of CDs printed have become collectors items.

Personal life 
Harrison began dating Lauren Zelman in 2005. They married on March 25, 2012 and have a son.

Filmography

References

External links
 

1982 births
20th-century American male actors
21st-century American male actors
American male child actors
American male film actors
American male television actors
Living people
Male actors from Portland, Oregon
People from Tualatin, Oregon